Cirrochroa imperatrix is a species of butterfly of the family Nymphalidae. It was described by Henley Grose-Smith in 1894. It is found on Biak and Supiori, and is possibly also present on Sulawesi and New Guinea.

References 

Vagrantini
Butterflies described in 1894